Portrait Records was a sister label of Epic Records and later of Columbia Records. Notable artists Cyndi Lauper and Sade signed with Portrait, but their contracts were absorbed by Epic after that incarnation of the label was shuttered.

History & Overview

Portrait began in 1976 as a sister label of Epic; its initial signings were Joan Baez, Burton Cummings, and the McCrarys. Cummings' "Stand Tall" was the lead-off single. Baez's Blowin' Away album and the McCrarys' self-titled debut bowed in early 1977. The label design was similar to that of Columbia's singles; design on it was in grey tones, while the logo was handwritten orange with a red outline. This was also the launch of Epic/Portrait/Associated (EPA) under the CBS moniker.

One of the signings the label had was the band Heart. The band had been signed with Mushroom Records, but left after a dispute in advertising their Dreamboat Annie album. The print ads led some fans to think that the sisters Ann and Nancy Wilson were lesbians. Portrait snatched the group up quickly, releasing the single "Barracuda" before Little Queen was to hit the shelves. The McCrarys also scored big with "You".

By 1979, however, Epic was looking to consolidate some of its low-end producing labels and, for a short time, Portrait and Epic had both names on the same label. In 1980, only Heart was picked up from Portrait; releasing Bébé le Strange, after which they took a two-year hiatus, releasing Private Audition in 1982.

Baez left the label after the release of her 1979 Honest Lullaby album; she later admitted in her 1987 memoir, And a Voice to Sing With, that she regretted signing with the label, describing her having left her previous label (A&M) for Portrait as "the stupidest career move I ever made".

In 1982, the label was relaunched again tapping into the new wave scene and other music not gaining any airplay. It signed artists such as Altered Images, Aldo Nova, Accept, Arc Angel, Hawaiian Pups, The Elvis Brothers, Eddy Grant, Orion the Hunter, The Producers, Saga, and Peter Baumann (formerly of Tangerine Dream). The label was completely black but the red logo stayed intact. Portrait struck gold again with the signings of Cyndi Lauper and Sade, both in 1983. Americans wouldn't get Sade until a year later. Aldo Nova did make some headway with the songs "Fantasy" and "Monkey on Your Back" from his Subject...Aldo Nova album. Saga also found success with the songs "On the Loose" and "Wind Him Up", which would gain the band gold and platinum albums worldwide. In 1985, British singer Toyah released her album Minx on Portrait. In 1986, British guitarist and songwriter Bill Nelson released  (US title:  on the label.

By the end of 1986, the only act making money on this label was Lauper. Her album True Colors went platinum, but it wasn't enough to keep the label afloat. At the end of 1986, Portrait was shuttered again.

In 1988, the label re-emerged once more but as a contemporary jazz outfit, with signings as diverse as Stanley Clarke, Ornette Coleman, Prime Time and Japanese import T-Square. The logo changed dramatically. This time the label had two: the primary one was a painted P with the word "portrait" in a red block, while the secondary one was an outline drawing of a woman. This one was gone by 1990.

Epic did try to make the label work two more times: in 1988, it was trying to do jazz collections, and, in 1999, it was relaunched through Columbia Records as a hard-rock/metal label, signing Ratt, Cinderella, Great White, the Union Underground, and Mars Electric. In 2000, Iron Maiden signed with Portrait in conjunction with Columbia Records in the US. Finally, after trying so hard to keep it afloat, Portrait dissolved in 2002 after the US release of Iron Maiden's Rock in Rio album.

In late 2012, Sony Masterworks reactivated the label as a classical music imprint with its first artists The Piano Guys on the newly relaunched imprint, and subsequently transferring Jackie Evancho to Portrait from the Columbia label.

Artists

Through Epic
 Burton Cummings
 Saga
 Heart
 Cyndi Lauper
 Eddy Grant
 Bill Nelson
 Sade
 Joan Baez
 Toyah

Through Columbia
 Cinderella
 Great White
 Ratt
 The Union Underground

Through Sony Masterworks
 Jackie Evancho
 Natalie Imbruglia
 The Piano Guys
 Yanni

See also
 List of record labels

References

American record labels
Record labels established in 1976
Record labels established in 2012
Record labels disestablished in 2002
Rock record labels
Pop record labels
Jazz record labels
Columbia Records
Epic Records
1976 establishments in the United States